A street artist is a person who makes art in public places. Street artists include portrait artists, caricaturists, graffiti artists, muralists and people making crafts. Street artists can also refer to street performers such as musicians, acrobats, jugglers, living statues, and street theatre performers. Street artists can be seen throughout the world.

Legality
Some countries and sub-national jurisdictions require a license or permit in order to do business as a street artist. Without legal authorization, artists run the risk of being fined or arrested by the police if municipal ordinances prohibit their activities. For graffiti artists and muralists, part of the experience may be finding a suitable wall, permitted or not. In some municipalities, artists may apply for a license that allows them to legally occupy public space or a permit to paint a building. These licenses and permits place limitations on where the artist can perform or create their art, and may also regulate what artists are allowed to sell or depict. San Francisco, Berkeley, and Seattle are American cities that regulate the display and trade of artists selling their wares on the street. Additionally, San Francisco has a public approval process for murals painted on public buildings or using public money on private property.

Graffiti art is often seen as a controversial art form and can at times be referred to as vandalism. However some graffiti artists have become famous for their art, notably Banksy and Shepard Fairey also known as Obey.

Gallery

See also
 Mural
 Graffiti
 Street painting
 Street art
 Busking
 Pike Place Market
 Street Artists Program of San Francisco
 Street Fashion
 Street Style
 Street Photography

References

External links

Zina Saunders' Overlooked New York: Central Park artists
German street artists

Street performance

Artist